The Division of Watson is an Australian electoral division in the state of New South Wales.

Watson is an urban electorate and extends from the Hume Highway, Canterbury Road and the M5 as far west as Stacey Street and Joseph Street in Sydney. It has a large immigrant population, with significant Chinese, Bangladeshi, and Lebanese communities.

History

The division was created at the redistribution of 31 January 1992, to replace the abolished Division of St George and is named after the Right Honourable Chris Watson, the first Labor Prime Minister of Australia. It was first contested at the 1993 federal election. There was previously another Division of Watson (1934-69), originally Chris Watson's old seat of South Sydney and located in the south-eastern suburbs of Sydney, however that Division is not connected to this one except in name. In the 2009 redistribution, the boundaries of Watson moved significantly northwest, losing the south-eastern suburbs in the St George area such as Hurstville, retaining the south-western suburbs such as Belmore, and adding a significant part of the Inner West.

While St George was a marginal seat, Watson has been a safe Labor seat for nearly all of its existence. The only time that Labor's hold was seriously threatened was in 2013, when Labor was held to 56 percent of the two-party vote.

It has previously been held by Leo McLeay, a former Speaker of the Australian House of Representatives. The current Member for Watson, since the 2004 federal election, is Tony Burke, a member of the Australian Labor Party.

In 2017, the division had the second-highest percentage of "No" responses in the 2017 Australian Marriage Law Postal Survey, with 69.64% of the electorate's respondents to the survey responding "No". The Survey had strong opposition from Muslim voters in the electorate.

Demographics 
Watson is a diverse and socially conservative electorate which is historically working-class. Despite being a stronghold for the centre-left Labor Party, many voters in Watson maintain socially-conservative values from their immigrant cultures. According to the 2016 census, only 44.4% of electors were born in Australia. 

At 23.4%, Watson has one of the highest Islamic populations of any electorate in Australia, more than 20 times the national average.

Boundaries
Federal electoral division boundaries in Australia are determined at redistributions by a redistribution committee appointed by the Australian Electoral Commission. Redistributions occur for the boundaries of divisions in a particular state, and they occur every seven years, or sooner if a state's representation entitlement changes or when divisions of a state are malapportioned.

Members

Election results

References

External links
 Division of Watson - Australian Electoral Commission

Electoral divisions of Australia
Constituencies established in 1993
1993 establishments in Australia